This is a list of libraries in Singapore:

National libraries
These libraries are managed by the National Library Board.

National Library, Singapore
Lee Kong Chian Reference Library
National Reference Library (former)

Regional libraries
Jurong Regional Library (former Jurong East Community Library)
Punggol Regional Library (Coming soon)
Tampines Regional Library
Woodlands Regional Library

Public libraries
Ang Mo Kio Public Library
Bedok Public Library
Bishan Public Library
Bukit Batok Public Library
Bukit Panjang Public Library
Central Public Library
Cheng San Public Library
Choa Chu Kang Public Library
Clementi Public Library
Geylang East Public Library
Jurong West Public Library
library@chinatown
library@esplanade
library@harbourfront (Replaced Bukit Merah Public Library, opened in 2019)
library@orchard (Re-opened in 2014 at Orchard Gateway)
Marine Parade Public Library
Pasir Ris Public Library
Queenstown Public Library
Sembawang Public Library
Serangoon Public Library 
Sengkang Public Library
Toa Payoh Public Library
The LLiBrary (a partnership between SkillsFuture SG and the National Library Board)
Yishun Public Library

Private libraries

Academic libraries
Nanyang Technological University
Art, Design & Media Library
Business Library
Chinese Library
Communication & Information Library
Humanities & Social Sciences Library
Lee Wee Nam Library
Library Outpost
Medical Library
Wang Gungwu Library
National University of Singapore
C J Koh Law Library 
Central Library 
Chinese Library 中文图书馆 
Hon Sui Sen Memorial Library 
Medical Library 
Music Library 
Science Library 
Singapore Management University
Li Ka Shing Library
Kwa Geok Choo Law Library
Singapore University of Technology and Design
SUTD Library 
Ngee Ann Polytechnic
Lien Ying Chow Library
Republic Polytechnic
Republic Polytechnic Library
Singapore Institute of Management
Tay Eng Soon Library
Singapore Polytechnic
Main Library
Nanyang Polytechnic
Nanyang Polytechnic Library
Temasek Polytechnic
Temasek Polytechnic Library
Buddhist Library
Buddhist Library in Aljunied

Specialist libraries
SAFTI Military Institute
SAFTI Military Institute Library
Singapore Botanic Gardens
Library of Botany and Horticulture
Singapore Sports Hub
Sports Hub Library

References

External links
National Library Board Libraries

 
Libraries
Singapore
Libraries